Groundswell is the first LP album by Parts & Labor, released in 2003 on JMZ Records. The album is entirely instrumental. The enhanced content features a video for the song "Intervention".

Track listing
"It's Not the End of the World" – 0:34
"Autopilot" – 3:52
"Mike Burke for President" – 3:20
"Intervention" – 3:26
"Parts & Labor" – 3:51
"Happy New Year" – 5:01
"Railgun" – 1:23
"Broken Man Going to Work" – 3:49
"TB Strut" – 4:45
"Groundswell" – 5:28

Reception

 Pitchfork Media (7.2/10) 8 March 2004

2003 debut albums
Parts & Labor albums